Pasha Aliyev is a retired Azerbaijani footballer who played as a defender.

Honours
Top Goal Scorer: Azerbaijan Premier League with 12 goals for Dynamo-Bakili Baku.
Winner: AK Cup 2001, Mashhad, Iran with F.C. Aboomoslem.

References

External links

Azerbaijani footballers
Living people
F.C. Aboomoslem players
Azerbaijani expatriate footballers
Expatriate footballers in Iran
Association football defenders
Year of birth missing (living people)